NBA Street is a basketball video game developed by NuFX and EA Canada. It was released in 2001 by EA Sports BIG for the PlayStation 2 and in 2002 for the GameCube. It combines the talent and big names of the National Basketball Association with the attitude and atmosphere of streetball. NBA Street is the first game in the NBA Street series and was followed by NBA Street Vol. 2, NBA Street V3, and NBA Street Homecourt.

Gameplay
NBA Street is based on three-on-three street basketball. Aside from the basic structure of basketball, players try to collect trick points, which are scored through the use of almost every basketball game maneuver such as doing fancy dribble moves, faking out defenders, shot blocking, diving for the ball, and dunking. If a team fills their trick meter, they get to perform a Gamebreaker, which is a special shot that not only adds to their score, but it subtracts an amount from their opponents' score.

The single player mode "City Circuit" involves making a user-created player, touring famous American locations and picking up teammates from NBA rosters along the way.

The game has "arcade" style gameplay, similar to the NBA Jam series. Games are scored not by traditional standards, as two-point field goals are worth one point, while made shots behind the 3-point line are worth two. Instead of a time limit, the first team to score 21 points are deemed the winner. However, the winner must win by 2.

Cast and characters
Twenty-nine NBA teams are playable, with rosters from around 2000 and 2001. However, only 5 players are available from each team. Michael Jordan, who announced his comeback from his second retirement with the Washington Wizards a few months after the PlayStation 2 release, is available on both the Gamecube and PlayStation 2 versions. He was however removed as the "Final Challenge" in the Gamecube version as he now played for the Washington Wizards in the game. Instead, the City Circuit ended once a player beat the Street Legend "Stretch".

The game introduced several recurring characters called Street Legends, fictional basketball players who served as the series' bosses, each masterful in a particular aspect of basketball and representing a specific area of the United States. Their personalities and appearances were loosely inspired by real players, such as Stretch, the "cover athlete" who resembles Julius Erving in looks and abilities.

Reception

In the United States, NBA Streets PlayStation 2 version sold 1.7 million copies and earned $57 million by August 2006. Between January 2000 and August 2006, this release was the 18th highest-selling game launched for the PlayStation 2, Xbox or GameCube consoles in the United States. Combined sales for all NBA Street games released between January 2000 and August 2006, across the three game systems, reached 5.5 million units in the United States by the latter date.

Kevin Toyama reviewed the PlayStation 2 version of the game for Next Generation, rating it four stars out of five, and stated that "Despite a few small imperfections, NBA Street delivers a basketball experience even sports game cynics can't help but love."

The game received "favorable" reviews on both platforms according to video game review aggregator Metacritic. In Japan, Famitsu gave it a score of 31 out of 40 for the PS2 version, and 30 out of 40 for the GameCube version. It was a runner-up in GameSpots annual award category for the best alternative sports console game, which went to Tony Hawk's Pro Skater 3.

With the success of the NBA Street series, EA Sports BIG expanded to the format to football with NFL Street and soccer with FIFA Street.

References

External links

2001 video games
EA Sports Big games
GameCube games
National Basketball Association video games
NBA Street game series
NuFX games
Electronic Arts games
PlayStation 2 games
Video games developed in Canada
Video games developed in the United States